Wallburg Realschule is a modern secondary school located in Eltmann, Germany, which is named after the local Wallburg castle ruins. The school is located on a hillside overlooking Eltmann, the Wallburg and the Main river. There are approximately 650 pupils and 40 teachers, who teach 23 different classes from Form 5 up to Form 10. 

Pupils can play table tennis during breaks. Wallburg Realschule has a very large gymnasium, a playground and even a big pond. There is also a library especially for pupils, and an assembly hall which has a big stage for performances.

School starts at 7:55 am and usually ends at 1:00 pm, with optional afternoon classes. The Wallburg Realschule has three computer rooms and one laptop cart.

The school address is: 
"Realschule Wallburg, Oskar-Serrand-Str. 29, 97483 Eltmann"

External links
 rs-eltmann.de/ Official website

Schools in Bavaria
Educational institutions with year of establishment missing